Clé: Levanter (stylized as Clé : LEVANTER) is the fifth extended play (sixth overall) by South Korean boy group Stray Kids. It was released on December 9, 2019, by JYP Entertainment and distributed through Dreamus. The EP spawned three singles. Its lead single, "Double Knot", was released on October 9, 2019, followed by "Astronaut" on November 14, 2019, and the title track "Levanter" on the same day as the EP released date.

The EP was originally set to be released on November 25, 2019, but was delayed to December 9, 2019, due to member Woojin's departure from the group on October 27, 2019. Woojin's departure resulted in the group having to re-record the songs on the EP without Woojin's voice.

Background 
On the half of October with the success of its lead single of "Double Knot", JYP announced that the group will held Olympic Hall starting November 23–24, with their upcoming mini-album Clé: Levanter will be released on November 25.

Following Woojin's departure was announced on October 27, the release date was pushed back to December as a result. Concept teasers were released on November 27 following the music video teasers on December 6–7 and the full music video release on December 9.

Commercial performance 
Clé: Levanter was a success in term of album sales, debuting atop the Gaon Album Chart and topping the chart for two consecutive weeks. The EP became the second best-selling album for the December issue of Gaon Monthly Album Chart with 182,300 copies sold. The EP also charted at number 30 of Gaon Year-End Album Chart for 2019, became the best-selling album of the group in 2019.

Track listing

Charts

Weekly charts

Year-end charts

Certifications

Accolades

Notes

References 

2019 EPs
JYP Entertainment EPs
IRiver EPs
Korean-language EPs
Stray Kids EPs